Apulian cuisine consists of the cooking traditions and practices of the region of Apulia in Italy. Starting from the Middle Ages the permanent residence of the nobility in the region gradually declined, which caused the disappearance of their noble cuisine over time. As the common people suffered from poverty, their culinary tradition adapted to use cheap and simple foods. Bread, vegetables and pasta have the leading role in the cuisine. Fruits, fish and wine are consumed frequently as well, but meat plays a minor role. The food of Apulia is known as a prime example of cucina povera or 'cuisine of the poor', but this characterizes its simplicity rather than its quality. More so, the simple dishes allow the quality of their local and seasonal ingredients to take center stage.

Sagre food festivals 
Apulia’s sagre food festivals showcase local cuisine, cooking traditions and culture. While not unique to Apulia - sagre festivals are one of Italy’s best kept food secrets - food is an integral part of the region’s identity and these are intensely social occasions where you can feast side by side with locals.

History 
After the period of Magna Graecia, Apulia never had political autonomy. It was always a peripheral region of a larger state. From the Middle Ages until the Italian unification in the 19th century Apulia was controlled by the Kingdom of Naples and later the Kingdom of the Two Sicilies. It was governed from Naples in Campania, the capital of both kingdoms.

The nobility, which owned large tracts of land in Apulia, preferred to live in Naples. If they spent any time in Apulia, it was for brief inspections of their properties and the collection of profits. As a consequence the cuisine of the nobility started to disappear in Apulia during the 18th and 19th centuries. The cuisine of the monasteries, which were present in large numbers in Apulia, never became part of the local tradition. As charitable institutions which supported the poor, the food they served them was limited to soups.

Because of these factors, the cuisine of common people defines the gastronomy of Apulia. Historically Apulia was a poor region, which meant that ingredients had to be affordable, local and seasonal. Due to this frugality vegetables attained an important role. Dishes are simple, without elaborate preparations. The food of Apulia is often characterized as peasant food or cucina povera, the 'cuisine of the poor'. In spite of this, the dishes are richer and more complex than the number of ingredients and the simplicity of the cooking methods would suggest.

The first cookbook on Apulian cuisine was Il Libro della Cocina from 1504, which covered the cooking of the nobility. It contains some recipes which are not Apulian, but which became part of the local tradition over time. This demonstrates that Apulians were eager to adopt cooking practices from other regions and integrate them into their own cuisine.

In modern times Apulian cuisine distinguishes between appetizers, first and second courses. Separate courses are a relatively new addition to the cuisine, because in the past a meal used to consist of a single dish. Many dishes now served as appetizers were inspired by single dishes which made up an entire meal. Some dishes which are now served as first courses can still be quite filling and rich in ingredients, which reflect their use as a single dish for the entire meal.

Ingredients and dishes

Snacks and appetizers 

Many foods which are eaten as a snack or appetizer are based on bread. The puccia (plural pucce) is a small, flat and round bread which may or may not have olives mixed through its dough. The version with olives is eaten as is, but the version without olives is sliced open and stuffed with many kinds of vegetables, meat or seafood. The panzerotto is a turnover filled with various stuffings. A combination of tomatoes and mozzarella is popular. They are similar to the calzone of Naples, but are smaller and use a softer dough. They can be baked in the oven like calzone, but deep frying is traditional. Focaccia Barese is a local variation of focaccia originating from Bari, which is covered with tomatoes, oregano and optionally olives, with olive oil drizzled on top.

The rustico which is popular in the area of Lecce doesn't use bread but puff pastry as a base. The pastry is filled with béchamel sauce, mozzarella and tomato sauce and then baked in the oven. Scagliozzi may be the only popular way to eat polenta in Apulia. Polenta is prepared normally and then allowed to cool and dry. It is then cut in slices and deep fried. Pettole are deep-fried croquettes made from a liquid batter of flour with yeast, which may include boiled potatoes. There are both flavoured versions with small pieces of fish or vegetables and sweet versions.

Taralli are popular toroidal crackers made with flour, olive oil, white wine and salt along with other ingredients. The classical version uses fennel seeds, but they come in many variations and can be savoury or sweet. They are eaten as is or dunked in wine.

Bread 

Bread is a very important part of the Apulian diet. The vast majority of wheat cultivated in Puglia is durum wheat, with minimal production of common wheat. For this reason many types of bread are made entirely or partially with durum wheat. The most highly regarded breads are Pane di Altamura, Pane di Laterza and Pane di Monte Sant'Angelo. Pane di Altamura was granted Protected Designation of Origin (PDO) status in the European Union (EU) and is made entirely with durum wheat flour, just like Pane di Laterza. Pane di Monte Sant'Angelo stands out because it is traditionally made with only common wheat flour.

Frisella is a bread with a long shelf life, making it a suitable alternative to fresh bread. It has a toroidal shape with a hole in the center, which facilitated stringing them together for storage and transport. The dough is made with either wheat, durum or barley flour. After a first stage of baking in the oven, the friselle is cut horizontally and then baked in the oven again until they are completely dry. Before consumption the friselle is soaked in water until it is still crisp but not mushy. It is then eaten with a variety of toppings.

Instead of disposing of stale bread, Apulians have invented many dishes to make it palatable. Cialledda, also called aquasale, is one of these. After soaking bread in water to soften it, it is combined with tomatoes, olive oil and salt. The dish pancotto is similar, but more elaborate with more ingredients. Stale bread is also used to make dry breadcrumbs which can be used a garnish for several dishes.

Cheese 

The cheese from Apulia which is most popular internationally is the fresh cheese burrata. This cheese consists of an outer shell of mozzarella which is filled with stracciatella and cream. Only burrata di Andria is protected under the Protected Geographical Indication (PGI) status by the EU, so the generic name is also used for burrata produced outside Apulia. The PDO cheeses of Apulia are the aged caciocavallo Silano, canestrato Pugliese and fresh mozzarella di bufala Campana. Other cheeses include caciocavallo podolico, cacioricotta Pugliese, pallone di Gravina and several varieties of ricotta, of which ricotta forte has an especially strong flavor.

Fruit 
Just like other regions in Southern Italy, olive oil is the principal cooking fat. While table olives are now frequently served as appetizers, they were even more important in the past as they were often the only available food next to bread. Apulia is Italy's largest producer of olive oil and table olives, with many local varieties. No less than five of these oils and one table olive, respectively the Collina di Brindisi, Dauno, Terra di Bari, Terra d'Otranto, Terre Tarentine and La Bella della Daunia, are protected under the PDO status.

Many different sweet fruits are enjoyed as a dessert at the end of a meal. The arancia del Gargano and clementine del Golfo di Taranto are respectively an orange and clementine which enjoy PDO status. The limone femminello del Gargano is a lemon which was granted PGI status. The fruit of the prickly pear cactus which dots the countryside is consumed as well.

Soups 
Soups are especially popular as winter dishes, with a main role for vegetables along with legumes and short pasta shapes. Bread is often included as well, either on the side or included in the soup. The bread dishes cialledda and pancotto may also be prepared in the form of a soup if a vegetable broth is added. A soup from the Salento is called cecamariti, literally meaning 'blinding the husband'. The dish received its name from its impressive appearance, which conceals its easy preparation. There are also fish soups, which feature a rich broth due to the addition of small fish with bones included.

Pasta 

Eggs are an essential ingredient for pasta in Northern Italy, but in Apulia and other regions of Southern Italy only semolina and water is used. This was done mainly for economic reasons, because eggs were considered too valuable for an everyday dish like pasta. Omitting eggs from pasta dough allowed their use in other dishes.

Orechiette is considered the signature pasta shape of Apulia, but there are many other shapes as well. These include cavatelli, capunti (typical of the Murgia plateau), troccoli (from the Daunia), lagane and sagne. Orrechiette is frequently combined with fried cime di rape in orrechiette con le cime di rape. Next to the familiar combinations of pasta with tomato sauces, meat and seafood, there are some typically Apulian pairings with vegetables. For example, the dish ciceri e tria uses chickpeas and lagane con puré di fave uses broad bean puree.

Pasta can also be made with grano arso, 'burnt grain'. In the past the remaining ears of grains would be gathered from the grain fields after the grain harvest, when the grain stubbles were burnt to clear the field. While this used to be done out of extreme poverty or frugality, pasta made with grano arso is now considered a delicacy.

Vegetables 
Broad beans and cime di rape are the iconic vegetables of Apulia. The broad bean has been the staple food in the region for thousands of years. In its dried and split form it is the main ingredient of the famous dish fave e cicoria. Other frequently used vegetables include fennel, zucchini, artichoke, bell pepper, cauliflower, eggplant, wild leaf chicory, the cardoncello mushroom and broccoli. The carciofo Brindisino and lenticchia di Altamura are respectively artichokes and lentils which have attained the PGI status from the EU.

Many vegetables are preserved with the sott'olio method, meaning 'under the oil'. First vegetables are boiled in white wine vinegar. After they are combined with spices and herbs they are placed in jars. The vegetables are then covered by filling the jar with olive oil, so that they are not in contact with air. This allows the vegetables to be preserved for up to year and also enhances their flavor.

Apulian cooking also uses some less widely known vegetables. The tassel hyacinth grows widespread in the wild and is used for its bulb. Known as lampascioni in Apulia, these are usually boiled in water and seasoned with olive oil, vinegar, salt and black pepper. They can also be grilled or deep-fried.

The black chickpea (ceci neri) was consumed more often before the 1950s, but production dropped as it was replaced by more profitable crops and legumes with shorter cooking times. Today production is centered in the Murgia plateau. Because they have a stronger taste than the white variety, they are often just boiled in water and served with oil, possibly combined with a small type of pasta.

The grass pea (cicerchia) used to be popular in cookbooks of the 1600s, but has since fallen out of favor because the plant provides a limited yield and is toxic if eaten as a staple. In recent times the crop has been rediscovered and is cultivated in the Alta Murgia and the Salento. It is used in soups and stews.

Seafood 

Because Apulia is a peninsula, it has a long coastline and the sea is never far away. This has made seafood an important part of its cuisine. The large variety of seafood that is available includes sea bream, octopus, prawns, oysters, anchovies, mussels and clams. The region has been compared with Japan for its love of raw fish.

One of the more popular dishes is tiella, a slow-cooked dish layered with rice, potatoes and mussels. This version originates from Bari, but there is plenty of local variation in the recipe, with different versions originating from Foggia, Taranto and the Salento. Some of these don't even include seafood. Scapece is a fish dish from Gallipoli, Apulia which is notable for its preservation method. Similar to escabeche, fish is fried and then preserved in red wine vinegar with breadcrumbs and saffron to greatly extend its shelf life. Some dishes use dried and salted cod (baccalà), one of the very few imported ingredients.

Meat 
In the past meat was a scarcity due to its expense. For this reason, it is not an important component of the cuisine of Apulia. Beef was lacking almost entirely from the diet in the past, because cattle was used for farm work or reared for milk. It was slaughtered only when it was very old. Likewise, the prevalence of horse meat is explained by the slaughter of lame horses which were no longer able to work. Lamb, poultry and rabbit (often reared on farms) and to a lesser degree game were the main sources of meat. A farm used to raise a single pig, of which every part would be used when it was slaughtered. Some of its meat would be consumed directly, but most of it would be preserved as ham, sausages and salami.

The Apulian recipe for ragù differs from the version prepared in other Italian regions. Traditionally it uses sun-dried tomato pulp (conserva) as a base, which is then fried in olive oil with some water, fresh tomatoes and optionally chili pepper and red wine. Then meat braciole (or involtini) are added, which can be used together with the sauce to dress pasta dishes. Apart from quality cuts of meat, there are also recipes which call for offal in the form of roulades and pig's trotters.

Sweets 

The ingredients for sweets are sometimes influenced by the Middle East and include almonds, figs, hazelnuts, pistachios and spices. The traditional sweetener is honey, which is still frequently used. Fresh soft ricotta is used as well.

Wine 

In 2017 Apulia overtook Veneto as the largest wine producing region in Italy, with a total production of 9.070.112 hectoliters. It has been producing grapes with a high alcohol content for ages, which were used by other regions in Italy and France for mixing with their own wines. Since the 1990s Apulian winemakers have started taking more risks and using more innovative winemaking techniques. Today it produces wines with many different indigenous grape varieties. The most well-known wine internationally is Primitivo di Manduria, but there are many other varieties such as the Negroamaro, Bombino Bianco, Pampanuto, Verdeca, Bianco d'Alessano and Susumaniello.

References

Sources 

Cuisine of Apulia